David Wallace-Wells (born 1982) is an American journalist known for his writings on climate change. He wrote the 2017 essay "The Uninhabitable Earth;" the essay was published in New York as a long-form article and was the most read article in the history of the magazine. Wells later expanded the article into a 2019 book of the same title. He is currently an editor-at-large for New York and covers the climate crisis and the COVID-19 pandemic extensively. He was hired in March 2022 by The New York Times to write a weekly newsletter and contribute to The New York Times Magazine.

Early life and education 
David Wallace-Wells was born in 1982 in the Bronx New York and grew up in Riverdale. His maternal grandparents were German Jews who fled Nazi Germany in 1939. His father was an academic and his mother worked as a kindergarten teacher in East Harlem. 

David Wallace-Wells attended the University of Chicago and graduated from Brown University in 2004 with a degree in history.

He is married to Risa Needleman.

Career
Wallace-Wells' work has appeared in New York magazine, where he is an editor-at-large. He also writes for The Guardian. He was a 2019 National Fellow at New America. In March 2019, he appeared on The Joe Rogan Experience podcast. On July 17, 2019, Wallace-Wells appeared on an episode of The Doctor's Farmacy, a video produced by functional physician, Mark Hyman.

Climate writing 
Since 2017, Wallace-Wells has written extensively about climate change in New York magazine. He has said that he is optimistic about the earth's environmental future, but he remains cautious. He has said that no matter the degree of environmental damage, "it will always be the case that the next decade could contain more warming, and more suffering, or less warming and less suffering."

His best known work is "The Uninhabitable Earth", an article published July 9, 2017 in New York magazine. The essay received mixed to negative criticism from many scientists, but was considered an impactful work by some reviewers. Wallace-Wells later turned the work into a full-length book of the same name, published in 2019. Both works are characterized by speculation regarding climate change's potential to dramatically impact human life, which Wallace-Wells describes in "meticulous and terrifying detail."

Writing in The Guardian in 2021, Wallace‑Wells argues that the scale of climate change adaptation required globally is unprecedented. Indeed, Wallace‑Wells opines that "the world's vanguard infrastructure is failing in today's climate, which is the most benign we will ever see again".

Works 
 The Uninhabitable Earth. New York: Tim Duggan, 2019. .

References

External links
  March 14, 2019
  March 25, 2019

1982 births
Living people
Journalists from New York City
Brown University alumni
New York (magazine) people
American male journalists
21st-century American journalists
21st-century American male writers